Pierre-Joseph Candeille (8 December 1744 – 24 April 1827) was a French composer and singer, born in Estaires. He studied at Lille before moving to Paris, where he worked singing basse-taille in the chorus of the Opéra and the Concert Spirituel between 1767 and 1781, except for a brief period (1771—1773) he spent in Moulins. From 1784, he became a full-time composer. He worked at the Opéra as choirmaster from 1800 to 1802 and again from 1804 to 1805, before retiring to live in Chantilly.

Candeille wrote four symphonies, as well as ballets, divertissements and sacred music (including a mass and a Magnificat). None of his operas achieved much success, with the exception of his revision of Jean-Philippe Rameau's Castor et Pollux. Candeille's version was premiered at the Paris Opéra on 14 June 1791. By 1 January 1793, it had had 50 performances. It continued to be one of the most popular operatic works in the Revolutionary and Napoleonic period and was last staged in 1817. Candeille retained much of Rameau's original music, including "almost all the dances."

Candeille was the father of the composer, singer and actor Amélie-Julie Candeille.

Works

Staged works
All information from Julian Rushton in Grove.

Unperformed works
Les fêtes lupercales (pastorale-héroïque), 1777
L'Amour et Psyché, Bacchus et Erigone, 1780 (proposed revision of two entrées of Mondonville's Les fêtes de Paphos)
Thémire (opéra), c.1781
Lausus et Lydie (opéra), 1786
Les jeux olympiques (opéra), 1788
Ladislas et Adélaide (opéra), 1791
Roxane et Statira, ou Les veuves d'Alexandre (tragédie lyrique), c.1792
Brutus (opéra), 1793
Danaé (opéra), c.1796
Tithon et l'Aurore (opéra), c.1796
Ragonde (pastorale-héroïque), c.1798
Pithys (pastorale-héroïque)

References

Sources
Beril H. Van Boer The Historical Dictionary of Music of the Classical Period, Scarecrow Press, 2012.
 Mark Darlow, Staging the French Revolution: Cultural Politics and the Paris Opera, 1789-1794, Oxford University Press, 2012.
Julian Rushton, "Candeille, Pierre-Joseph" in The New Grove Dictionary of Music and Musicians

1744 births
1827 deaths
People from Nord (French department)
French male classical composers
French opera composers
Male opera composers